Harlequin bug may refer to:
 Harlequin cabbage bug, Murgantia histrionica, a species of stinkbug found in North America
 Dindymus versicolor, a species of cotton stainer bug found in Australia